The Minister of State for Defence is a mid-level position in the Ministry of Defence in the British government. It is currently held by Baroness Goldie, who took the office on 26 July 2019.

Responsibilities 
The minister has the following ministerial responsibilities:

Corporate governance including transformation programme; single departmental plan, risk reporting and health, safety and security
Future relations with European Union
Engagement with retired senior Defence personnel and wider opinion formers
Arms control and counter-proliferation, including export licensing and chemical and biological weapons
Community engagement
Equality, diversity and inclusion
United Kingdom Hydrographic Office
Statutory Instrument programme
Australia, Asia and Far East defence engagement
Defence Fire and Rescue Service
Scotland, Wales and Northern Ireland devolved authorities
Ship wrecks, museums and heritage
Commemorations, ceremonial duties, medallic recognition and protocol policy
Casework
Ministry of Defence Police

List 

* Incumbent's length of term last updated: .

References

Ministry of Defence (United Kingdom)
Defence ministers of the United Kingdom
2015 establishments in the United Kingdom